STS-51-B was the 17th flight of NASA's Space Shuttle program, and the seventh flight of Space Shuttle Challenger. The launch of Challenger on April 29, 1985, was delayed by 2 minutes and 18 seconds, due to a launch processing failure. Challenger was initially rolled out to the pad to launch on the STS-51-E mission. The shuttle was rolled back when a timing issue emerged with the TDRS-B satellite. When STS-51-E was canceled, Challenger was remanifested with the STS-51-B payloads. The shuttle landed successfully on May 6, 1985, after a week-long mission.

Crew

Backup crew

Crew seating arrangements

Mission insignia  
The mission insignia features the Challenger with her payload doors open, to show the onboard Spacelab 3. The orbiter rides over the American flag. The seven crewmembers are represented by the 7 stars on the patch, that indirectly refer to the Mercury Seven as a nod to their legacy. Behind the orbiter, the contours of Pegasus can be seen, as a reference to the European Space Agency (ESA). The white board surrounding it all has the appearance of a space suit helmet, with the names of the two respective teams grouped around them on a round band encircling the insignia , and the two mission specialists on an added section below. To further create some sort of contrast, the team colors are reprised for each member's name.

Mission summary 

Challenger lifted off from Kennedy Space Center (KSC)'s launch pad 39A at 12:02:18 p.m. EDT on April 29, 1985. The crew members included Robert F. Overmyer, commander; Frederick D. Gregory, pilot; Don L. Lind, Norman E. Thagard and William E. Thornton, mission specialists; and Lodewijk van den Berg, of EG&G Energy Management, Inc., and Taylor G. Wang, of the Jet Propulsion Laboratory (JPL), both payload specialists. Average age of 48.6 was the oldest for an American space mission. Similar to the previous Spacelab mission (STS-9), the crew was divided roughly in half to cover 12-hour shifts, with Overmyer, Lind, Thornton and Wang forming the Gold team, and Gregory, Thagard and van den Berg as the Silver team.

STS-51-B was the second flight of the European Space Agency (ESA)'s Spacelab pressurized module, and the first with the Spacelab module in a fully operational configuration. Spacelab's capabilities for multi-disciplinary research in microgravity were successfully demonstrated. The gravity gradient attitude of the orbiter proved quite stable, allowing the delicate experiments in materials processing and fluid mechanics to proceed normally. The crew operated around the clock in two 12-hour shifts. Two squirrel monkeys and 24 rats were flown in special cages, the second time American astronauts flew live non-human mammals aboard the shuttle. The crew members in orbit were supported 24 hours a day by a temporary Payload Operations Control Center, located at the Johnson Space Center.

On the mission, Spacelab carried 15 primary experiments, of which 14 were successfully performed. Two Getaway Special (GAS) experiments required that they be deployed from their canisters, a first for the program. These were NUSAT (Northern Utah Satellite) and GLOMR (Global Low Orbiting Message Relay satellite). NUSAT deployed successfully, but GLOMR did not deploy, and was returned to Earth.

Challenger landed safely at Edwards Air Force Base at 12:11:04 p.m. EDT on May 6, 1985, after a mission lasting 7 days, 0 hour, 8 minutes, and 46 seconds.

Connection to the Challenger disaster 
While participating in the investigation into the destruction of Challenger during STS-51L in 1986, Overmyer discovered that a problem with the shuttle's O-rings, similar to that which led to the disaster, had emerged during the launch of STS-51B. Morton-Thiokol engineers told Lind after the mission that "you came within three-tenths of one second of dying". It was the problem with the O-rings on the left solid rocket motor (SRM) on this launch (SRM-16A) that prompted Roger Boisjoly to write a memo to Bob Lund about the potential for the O-rings to cause catastrophic failure.

See also 

 List of human spaceflights
 List of Space Shuttle missions

References

External links 

 NASA mission summary 
 STS-51B Video Highlights 

Space Shuttle missions
Edwards Air Force Base
1985 in the United States
1985 in spaceflight
Spacecraft launched in 1985
Spacecraft which reentered in 1985